The 2019 Maui Invitational Tournament was an early-season college basketball tournament played for the 36th time.  The tournament began in 1984, and was part of the 2019–20 NCAA Division I men's basketball season. The Championship Round was played at the Lahaina Civic Center in Maui, Hawaii from November 25 to 27, 2019.

Due to COVID-19 concerns in 2020 and 2021, the tournament did not return to Maui until 2022.

Bracket

References

Maui Invitational Tournament
Maui Invitational
Maui Invitational
Maui Invitational